M. nitida may refer to:
 Mantoida nitida, a praying mantis species
 Melanochyla nitida, a plant species
 Millettia nitida, a legume species

See also 
 Nitida (disambiguation)